Concerto per Theremin. Live in Italy is Lydia Kavina's second album. It was recorded in Italy in 1998 and released on CD by Teleura in 2000.

Theremin & Lydia Kavina

Invented in 1919 in Russia by Lev Sergeivitch Termen, the Theremin was not only the first electronic musical instrument, but also the first (and still the only) instrument played without touching it by moving the hands in the space between two antennas, one of which controls intonation and the other the volume.

Lydia Kavina is universally recognised as being the greatest virtuoso of the Theremin in the world. The niece of one of Lev Termen's first-degree cousins, Kavina began studying the Theremin under the direction of Termen himself when she was nine years old. Five years later, she was ready to give her first Theremin concert, which marked the beginning of a musical career that has so far led to more than 500 theatre, radio and television performances throughout the world.

In addition to giving concerts, Kavina is a composer of music for the Theremin (three of her works can be heard on this disc) and teaches the instrument in Russia, the United States and Western Europe.

Together with the London Philharmonic Orchestra, she participated in creating the sound track of the Oscar-winning film Ed Wood.

In 1999 has been published Lydia's first disc entitled "Music from the Ether".

(Liner notes by Valerio Saggini)

Track listing 
 Claire de Lune (4:14)Author: Claude DebussyPerformed by: Lydia Kavina, Mauro Cavalieri D'Oro
 The River (2:05)Author: Sergej RachmaninovPerformed by: Lydia Kavina, Mauro Cavalieri D'Oro
 Vocalise (3:12)Author: Sergej RachmaninovPerformed by: Lydia Kavina, Mauro Cavalieri D'Oro
 Smoke gets in your eyes (1:58)Author: Jerome KernPerformed by: Lydia Kavina, Mauro Cavalieri D'Oro
 The Nightingale (2:52)Author: Alexander AlabievPerformed by: Lydia Kavina, Mauro Cavalieri D'Oro
 Air on a G String (3:05)Author: Johann Sebastian BachPerformed by: Lydia Kavina, Columbus Orchestra
 Humoresque (2:47)Author: Antonin DvorâkPerformed by: Lydia Kavina, Columbus Orchestra
 Summertime (2:49)Author: George GershwinPerformed by: Lydia Kavina, Columbus Orchestra
 Palestinian Song (2:25)Author: Charles PaulPerformed by: Lydia Kavina, Mauro Cavalieri D'Oro
 Hora (2:39)Author: Charles PaulPerformed by: Lydia Kavina, Mauro Cavalieri D'Oro
 The Mirror (3:59)Author: Lydia KavinaPerformed by: Lydia Kavina, Columbus Orchestra
 Transformations (3:47)Author: Lydia KavinaPerformed by: Lydia Kavina, Columbus Orchestra
 Swampmusic (5:14)Author: Lydia KavinaPerformed by: Lydia Kavina

References

External links 
 An interview with Lydia Kavina
 Concerto per Theremin: the Live CD from Lydia Kavina

2000 live albums
Lydia Kavina albums
Theremins